Wieslochia weissi is an extinct species of passerine bird from the early Oligocene (27.8 - 33.9 Ma) of Germany. Remains of this species have been found in a clay pit in Frauenweiler near Wiesloch, Germany. The holotype is a dissociated skeleton on two slabs. Another specimen consisting of a mandible and a cranium has been found in the same geological area. The taxonomic affinities of Wieslochia are not well understood as it shares some similarities with suboscines but it seems more primitive in other features. It was first described by Gerald Mayr and Albrecht Manegold.

References

Passeriformes
Oligocene birds
Fossil taxa described in 2006
Fossils of Germany
Prehistoric bird genera
Extinct monotypic bird genera